Kotaku is a video game website and blog that was originally launched in 2004 as part of the Gawker Media network. Notable former contributors to the site include Luke Smith, Cecilia D'Anastasio, Tim Rogers, and Jason Schreier.

History 
Kotaku was first launched in October 2004 with Matthew Gallant as its lead writer, with an intended target audience of young men. About a month later, Brian Crecente was brought in to try to save the failing site. Since then, the site has launched several country-specific sites for Australia, Japan, Brazil and the UK. Crecente was named one of the 20 most influential people in the video game industry over the past 20 years by GamePro in 2009  and one of gaming's Top 50 journalists by Edge in 2006. The site has made CNET's "Blog 100" list and was ranked 50th on PC Magazines "Top 100 Classic Web Sites" list. Its name comes from the Japanese otaku (obsessive fan) and the prefix "ko-" (small in size).

Stephen Totilo replaced Brian Crecente as the editor in chief in 2012. Totilo had previously joined Kotaku in 2009 as deputy editor.

In April 2014, Gawker Media partnered with Future plc to launch Kotaku UK, and with Allure Media to launch Kotaku Australia.

Kotaku was one of several websites that was purchased by Univision Communications in their acquisition of Gawker Media in August 2016; Gizmodo Media Group was subsequently founded to house the Gawker acquisitions, operating under the Fusion Media Group, a division of Univision. The Gizmodo Media Group was later acquired by the private equity firm Great Hill Partners in April 2019, and renamed G/O Media.

In December 2018 Pedestrian Group, owned by the Australian media company Nine Entertainment, acquired Kotaku Australia. and  continues to own it.

The transition to G/O Media led to several departures from the site, as well as from other sister sites under the former Gawker Media label due to conflicts with G/O Media's management. Cecilia D'Anastasio left Kotaku in December 2019 to become a journalist for Wired. Joshua Rivera and Gita Jackson left in January 2020 stating it was impossible to work with the new management. Jason Schreier, one of Kotakus writers since 2012 known for his investigative in-depth coverage of working conditions at various studios and development histories for various video games, announced his departure from the site on April 16, 2020, citing the issues surrounding G/O Media which filtered into disruptions at their sister website Deadspin around October 2019. Schreier subsequently took a position at Bloomberg News. In May 2020, senior writer Harper Jay MacIntyre departed from Kotaku, similarly citing conflicts with management, and joined  Double Fine Productions as their content and community manager. 

Kotaku UK closed on September 9, 2020.

Totilo announced he was departing as editor in chief on February 5, 2021, though will remain in games journalism elsewhere. Riley MacLeod served as interim editor in chief following Totilo's departure, before Patricia Hernandez commenced her tenure as editor in chief from June 2, 2021.

Controversy 
In 2007, attorney Jack Thompson sued Gawker Media and site editor Brian Crecente over concerns that Kotaku declined to remove threatening user comments, but the lawsuit was dismissed the next day. In 2009, Business Insider reported that Hearst Corporation sought to buy Kotaku from Gawker Media. In 2010, Kotaku criticized Japanese magazine Famitsu's glowing endorsement of a Konami game as a conflict of interest; Konami subsequently revoked Kotakus invitation to the game's launch party.

Blacklistings 
In 2007, Kotaku ran a story about rumored upcoming features on the PlayStation 3, and Sony responded by temporarily blacklisting the website. In 2015, Kotaku claimed that they had been blacklisted by major video game companies Bethesda Softworks and Ubisoft. Because of this blacklist, Kotaku opted not to be a jury member in The Game Awards when invited by Geoff Keighley in 2019.

Gamergate harassment campaign 

In 2014, Kotaku was part of the accusations that instigated the harassment campaign known as Gamergate when a writer from the site, Nathan Grayson, was falsely accused of writing a favorable review of the game Depression Quest as a result of his relationship with its developer, Zoë Quinn. After conducting an internal review, it was discovered that no review of Depression Quest existed and he had only written one article that mentioned Quinn in passing before their relationship began. The subreddit /r/KotakuInAction became a hub for the Gamergate community. Its creator attempted to shut it down in 2018, claiming that it had become "infested with racism and sexism", but it was reinstated by a Reddit administrator due to the site's guidelines.

References

External links 
 
 

American gaming websites
Former Univision Communications subsidiaries
Gawker Media
Internet properties established in 2004
Video game news websites